Flunky (sometimes known as Mad Flunky) is an adventure game by Don Priestley for the ZX Spectrum, Commodore 64 and Amstrad CPC. It was published in 1987 by Piranha Software. The player takes control of a flunky in the service of the British Royal Family. The flunky is given orders by various members of the family which he must carry out. When he is successful in completing a task, he can obtain an autograph from the satisfied individual. Once he has successfully completed tasks for several persons he can go on to perform the final task for The Queen herself.

Gameplay

The player controls the flunky as he moves around Buckingham Palace, carrying out orders that members of the Royal Family will give him. The flunky can only be given one task to do at a time. The solutions needed to complete the tasks range from the correct use of items in the correct places to tasks requiring skillful playing more reminiscent of action games.

The game includes members of the Royal Family: The Prince of Wales, Diana, Princess of Wales, The Duke of York, The Duchess of York, and The Queen.

References

External links 
 
 
 Review from Your Sinclair (archived)

1987 video games
ZX Spectrum games
Commodore 64 games
Amstrad CPC games
Adventure games
Video games developed in the United Kingdom
Video games set in London